Now Is The Happiest Time Of Your Life is Daevid Allen's second solo studio album, originally released in 1977, and re-released in a digitally remastered version in 2009.

Track listing 
 "Flamenco Zero"
 "Why Do We Treat Ourselves Like We Do?"
 "Tally & Orlando Meet the Cockpot Pixie"
 "See You on the Moontower"
 "Poet for Sale"
 "Crocodile Nonsense Poem"
 "Only Make Love If You Want To"
 "I Am"
 "Deya Goddess"

Personnel 
 Daevid Allen, Guitar, Vocals, Producer
 Joan Biblioni, Guitar
 Sam Gopal, Percussion
 Pepe Milan, Guitar
 Victor Peraino, Keyboards
 Xavier Riba, Violin
 Marianne Oberasche, Harp

References 

1977 albums
Daevid Allen albums